Rasbora kottelati is a species of ray-finned fish in the genus Rasbora. It is found in northwestern Borneo.

Etymology
The fish is named in honor of Swiss ichthyologist Maurice Kottelat.

References

Rasboras
Freshwater fish of Borneo
Taxa named by Kelvin Kok Peng Lim
Fish described in 1995